Thyreonotus corsicus is a species belonging to the family Tettigoniidae  subfamily Tettigoniinae. It is found  in the western Mediterranean from the Iberian Peninsula over the south of France to the southwestern Alps. Isolated populations are found in Corsica and Sardinia.

References

Orthoptera of Europe
Tettigoniinae
Insects described in 1838